Malado Reld Anido is a Bissau-Guinean professional footballer who plays as a defender.

External links 
 

Bissau-Guinean footballers
Guinea-Bissau international footballers
Association football defenders
Living people

Year of birth missing (living people)